Alfred George Richard "Red" Carr (December 29, 1916 – May 16, 1990) was a Canadian ice hockey left winger. He played 5 games in the National Hockey League with the Toronto Maple Leafs during the 1943–44 season. The rest of his career, which lasted from 1934 to 1952, was spent in the minor leagues. He played junior hockey for the Winnipeg Junior Falcons. He was born in Winnipeg, Manitoba. He was the father of Gene Carr, who also played in the NHL. In September 2010 Carr was posthumously selected to be one of a number of athletes, builders, and media to be inducted into the Nanaimo Sports Hall of Fame.

Carr died on May 16, 1990.

Career statistics

Regular season and playoffs

References

The Montreal Gazette - 19 Dec 1961

External links 
 

1916 births
1990 deaths
Canadian ice hockey left wingers
Milwaukee Clarks players
Ontario Hockey Association Senior A League (1890–1979) players
Providence Reds players
Ice hockey people from Winnipeg
Toronto Maple Leafs players
Winnipeg Falcons players